Karolyn Kirby (born June 30, 1961, in Brookline, Massachusetts) is a retired female beach volleyball player from the United States. She won the bronze medal at the 1997 World Championships in Los Angeles, California, partnering Nancy Reno.  The pair also won the tournament at the 1992 Olympics, at which beach volleyball was a demonstration sport.

Kirby was a two-time AIAW volleyball All-American at Utah State, leading the Aggies to three-straight top 10 national finishes from 1979 to 1981. Kirby helped USU to a combined record of 106-38 (.736) during her three-year career, including a second-place finish in the 1979 AIAW Nationals at 35–5. Kirby was a two-time Intermountain All-Conference selection (1980–81).

References
 

1961 births
Living people
American women's beach volleyball players
Kentucky Wildcats women's volleyball players
Utah State Aggies women's volleyball players
Sportspeople from Brookline, Massachusetts
Competitors at the 1994 Goodwill Games
Goodwill Games medalists in beach volleyball
20th-century American women